The Abugach or, to the Russians, Abugachaevtsy, were a people from the region around the Ural Mountains and believed to have been of Samoyed ancestry.  Witnesses from the 19th century, however, identify their spoken language as Turkic.  Eventually, the Abugach became one of the ethnic groups that made up the Koibal sub-division of the Khakass.

Sources
Wixman, Ronald. The Peoples of the USSR: An Ethnographic Handbook. (Armonk, New York: M. E. Sharpe, Inc., 1984) p. 3

Ethnic groups in Russia